Bandon is a town in County Cork, Ireland. It lies on the River Bandon between two hills. The name in Irish means 'Bridge of the Bandon', a reference to the origin of the town as a crossing point on the river. In 2004 Bandon celebrated its quatercentenary. The town, sometimes called the Gateway to West Cork, had a population of 6,957 at the 2016 census. Bandon is in the Cork South-West (Dáil Éireann) constituency, which has three seats.

History
In September 1588, at the start of the Plantation of Munster, Phane Beecher of London acquired, as Undertaker, the seignory of Castlemahon. It was in this seignory that the town of Bandon was formed in 1604 by Phane Beecher's son and heir Henry Beecher, together with other English settlers John Shipward, William Newce and John Archdeacon. The original settlers in Beecher's seignory came from various locations in England. Originally the town proper was inhabited solely by Protestants, as a by-law had been passed stating "That no Roman Catholic be permitted to reside in the town". A protective wall extended for about a mile around the town. Written on the gates of Bandon at this time was a warning "Entrance to Jew, Turk or Atheist; any man except a Papist". A response was scrawled under the sign noting: "The man who wrote this wrote it well, for the same thing is writ on the gates of hell."

Buildings sprang up on both sides of the river and over time a series of bridges linked both settlements. Like other towns in Cork, it benefitted greatly from the patronage of Richard Boyle, 1st Earl of Cork, although he was not, as he liked to claim, its "founder". Christ Church, Kilbrogan, is the oldest church in Bandon, and also the oldest purpose-built post-Reformation Protestant church in Ireland. In 1689 it was the scene of a clash between Jacobite and Williamite forces during the War of the Two Kings. After an uprising by Protestant inhabitants who expelled the Irish Army garrison, a larger force under Justin McCarthy, Viscount Mountcashel arrived and retook the town.

Sir John Moore, who was later leader of the British Army and was killed at the Battle of Corunna in Spain in 1809, was governor of the town in 1798.

In the 19th century, the town grew as a leading industrial centre which included brewing, tanning, distilling, corn and cotton milling. The now closed Allman's Distillery produced at one point over 600,000 gallons of whiskey annually. The industrial revolution in the 1800s and the advent of the railways had a profound effect on the socioeconomic and cultural ecosystem of the area. Local weaving operations could not compete with mass-produced cheap imports. In 1847, St Peter's Church was built.

Major General Arthur Ernest Percival was commander of the British garrison in Bandon in 1920–21 during the Irish War of Independence. He was subsequently the commanding officer of the British troops who surrendered Singapore to the Japanese forces in 1942. In 1945 he was invited by Douglas MacArthur to witness the surrender of Japanese forces in Tokyo in 1945 which ended the Second World War. Irish army leader Michael Collins was killed in an ambush at Béal na Bláth, about  outside Bandon.

Between 1911 and 1926, the non-Catholic population of Bandon dropped from 688 (22% of the population) to 375 (13% of the population), a decline of 45.5%. Peter Hart argued, in The IRA and its Enemies (1998), that during the Irish War of Independence, Bandon's Protestant population, which was largely unionist, suffered from Irish Republican Army (IRA) reprisals. In particular, ten Protestant men were shot over 27–29 April 1922 (two months before the start of the Civil War), "because they were Protestant."

Niall Meehan argued, however (2008, 2014), that Hart was mistaken. The killings were not "motivated by either land agitation or by sectarian considerations." In Peter Hart, the Issue of Sources, Brian Murphy noted a British intelligence assessment, A Record of the Rebellion in Ireland in 1920–1921, that Hart cited selectively. Hart wrote, "the truth was that, as British intelligence officers recognised, "in the south the Protestants and those who supported the Government rarely gave much information because, except by chance, they had not got it to give".”. Murphy observed, "Hart does not give the next two sentences from the official Record which read":

 an exception to this rule was in the Bandon area where there were many Protestant farmers who gave information. Although the Intelligence Officer of the area was exceptionally experienced and although the troops were most active it proved almost impossible to protect those brave men, many of whom were murdered while almost all the remainder suffered grave material loss. 

Murphy, therefore, concluded in a 1998 review of Hart's research, "the IRA killings in the Bandon area were motivated by political and not sectarian considerations". He amended this in 2005 to "Possibly, military considerations, rather than political, would have been a more fitting way to describe the reason for the IRA response to those who informed." In 2013 Bandon Mayor Gillian Coughlan described a song about these historical events by Professor David Fitzpatrick of TCD as "insulting to the memory of people who fought and to people who died".

Castle Bernard, the seat of Lord Bandon, was also burned in the Irish War of Independence.

Festivals
Local festivals include the Bandon Summer Fest - a family festival run by volunteers over the August Bank Holiday weekend. The Bandon Music Festival takes place every June Bank Holiday weekend, and has included acts like Mick Flannery, Mundy, The Flaws, Jack L, Fred and The Delerentos. The Bandon Walled Town Festival runs every year on the last weekend of August, and celebrates the heritage of the town with cultural and family entertainment.

Twin city
Bandon has a twin city agreement with Bandon, Oregon, in the United States. That city was founded in 1873 by Lord George Bennet, a native of the Irish Bandon who named the American one after it, and who is known especially for having introduced gorse into the US ecology with some disastrous results.

Transport 
Bandon is 27 km southwest of Cork City, on the N71 national secondary road, and served by Bus Éireann bus services from Cork City. The nearest airport is Cork Airport.

Sports and community groups
Sports clubs in the area include Bandon Rugby Football Club (inaugural winners of the 1886 Munster Senior Rugby Cup), Bandon Association Football Club (whose men's senior team play in the Munster Senior League Senior Premier Division), and Bandon GAA (affiliated to the Carbery GAA division of Cork GAA).

Bandon Golf Club is an 18-hole golf course on the grounds of CastleBernard. Bandon Tennis Club (which has three courts at the golf club) operates a children's section with members on the Junior Irish Tennis Squad. There are a number of martial arts clubs in the town, including karate, taekwondo, Brazilian jiu-jitsu and other clubs.

A monthly community magazine, "The Opinion", is published locally.

Education
There are four secondary schools in Bandon. One of these, Bandon Grammar School, is a fee-paying Church of Ireland-ethos boarding school. The other schools are Hamilton High School, St. Brogan's College, and Coláiste na Toirbhirte (formerly known as Presentation Sisters College). Bandon Grammar School and St. Brogan's College are both mixed schools, Hamilton High School is a boys only school, and Coláiste na Toirbhirte is a girls only school.

People
People from or associated with Bandon include : 
Graham Norton, BBC chat show host, lived in Bandon and attended Bandon Grammar School. His mother still resides there.
Nicholas Brady, a poet known for the Tate and Brady collaboration on a new version of the Psalms, was born in Bandon in 1659.
George Bennett was born in Bandon in 1822. His 'History of Bandon' was published in 1869, and he founded the town of Bandon, Oregon in 1873.
Henry Gosnold, Chief Justice of Munster and friend of Francis Bacon, spent much of his life in Bandon, of which he became a burgess in 1612.
Attiwell Wood (c.1728-1784), a barrister and member of the Irish House of Commons, came from an old Bandon family.
Margaret Wolfe Hungerford, an author who wrote several Victorian era novels, lived in Bandon until her death of in 1897.
Eugene O'Keefe (1827–1913), a brewer and businessman, emigrated to Toronto and established the O'Keefe Brewery
Cornelius O'Sullivan, a brewer's chemist, was born in Bandon in 1842 and in 1866 appointed assistant brewer and chemist to Bass & Co.
Sir George Strickland Kingston, who emigrated to Australia and became a civil engineer, architect and politician, was born in Bandon in 1807.
Sir Richard Cox, Lord Chancellor of Ireland, was born in Bandon, 25 March 1650
Joseph Brennan (1887–1963), Chairman of the Currency Commission and Governor of the Central Bank of Ireland
Rev. James Long, an Anglican priest and orientalist who published the first English translation of the Bengali play Nil Darpan
Lloyd Jones (socialist), Cooperative Society activist, four times President of the Co-operative Congress, was born in Bandon in 1811
 Robert Baldwin Sullivan, second mayor of Toronto (1834–1839).
 Brian Crowley, Fianna Fáil MEP for the South (European Parliament constituency).
 Graham Dwyer, grew up in Bandon. He was convicted in 2015 of the murder of Dublin social worker Elaine O'Hara.
 Conor Hourihane, footballer and midfielder at Aston Villa F.C.

See also
 Bandonbridge (Parliament of Ireland constituency)
 Bandon (UK Parliament constituency)
 Kilbrogan House
 List of towns and villages in Ireland

References

External links

 Irish Historic Towns Atlas Online: Bandon by Patrick O'Flanagan for the Royal Irish Academy
 Bandon.ie

 
Towns and villages in County Cork
Populated places established in 1604
1604 establishments in the British Empire